The Madtown Doubledown is an annual mixed doubles curling tournament on the ISS Mixed Doubles World Curling Tour. It is held annually at the Madison Curling Club in McFarland, Wisconsin.

The purse for the event is $20,500, and its event categorization is 750 (highest calibre is 1000). It has one of the largest payouts on the mixed doubles tour.

The event has been held since 2018.

Past champions

References

External links
Official website

World Curling Tour events
Curling competitions in the United States
Sports competitions in Wisconsin
Mixed doubles curling
Sports in Madison, Wisconsin